The 1st Snetterton Coronation Trophy was a Formula Two motor race held on 30 May 1953 at Snetterton Circuit, Norfolk. The race was run over 10 laps, and was won by British driver Tony Rolt in a Connaught Type A-Lea Francis. Rolt also set fastest lap. Alan Brown in a Cooper T23-Bristol was second and Bobbie Baird in a Ferrari 500 was third.

Results

References 

1953 Formula Two races
1953 in British motorsport
May 1953 sports events in the United Kingdom